Richard Whiting Colman Jr. (November 11, 1914 – April 5, 1982) was an American football player and coach.  He served as the head football coach at Princeton University from 1957 to 1968, compiling a record of 75–33. Colman had been the assistant to Princeton's previous coach, Charlie Caldwell; like Caldwell, Colman was known for his successful reliance on the single-wing formation offense, and ultimately he became the last major college coach to use the single wing, which Princeton gave up only after Colman's departure in 1969. 

After retiring from coaching, Colman was the athletic director at Middlebury College from 1969 to 1977. Colman was inducted into the College Football Hall of Fame as a coach in 1990.

Head coaching record

References

External links
 
 

1914 births
1982 deaths
Middlebury Panthers athletic directors
Princeton Tigers football coaches
Princeton Tigers men's lacrosse coaches
Williams Ephs football coaches
Williams Ephs football players
College Football Hall of Fame inductees
People from Middlebury, Vermont
Players of American football from New York City